William Elmer Evans (December 14, 1877 – November 12, 1959) was a lawyer, real estate developer, and politician, who served as a Republican United States Congressman from California's 9th and 11th Congressional District.

Biography
William Elmer Evans was born in Laurel County, Kentucky in 1877.  He was educated at public schools and attended Sue Bennett Memorial College, in London, Kentucky.

Evans studied law and was admitted to the bar in 1902, commencing practice in London, Kentucky.  He later moved to Glendale, California in 1910 and continued to practice law and banking.  He was the city attorney of Glendale, California from 1911 to 1921 and a delegate to the Republican National Convention in 1924.

Evans was elected as a Republican to the Seventieth and to the three succeeding Congresses (March 4, 1927–January 3, 1935), and an unsuccessful candidate for re-election in 1934 to the Seventy-fourth Congress. In Congress he served on the House Naval Affairs Committee and the House Ways and Means Committee.

Later in life, Evans resumed the practice of law, real estate development, and ranching until his death in Los Angeles, California, November 12, 1959. He is interred at Forest Lawn Cemetery, Glendale, California.

See also
U.S. Congressional Delegations from California

References

External links

1877 births
1959 deaths
People from Laurel County, Kentucky
Republican Party members of the United States House of Representatives from California
Burials at Forest Lawn Memorial Park (Glendale)